The 1948 United States presidential election in Massachusetts took place on November 2, 1948, as part of the 1948 United States presidential election, which was held throughout all contemporary 48 states. Voters chose 16 representatives, or electors to the Electoral College, who voted for president and vice president.

Massachusetts voted for the Democratic nominee, incumbent President Harry S. Truman of Missouri, over the Republican nominee, former Governor Thomas E. Dewey of New York. Truman ran with Senator Alben W. Barkley of Kentucky, while Dewey's running mate was Governor Earl Warren of California.

Truman carried the state with 54.66% of the vote to Dewey's 43.16%, a Democratic victory margin of 11.50%. Progressive Party candidate Henry A. Wallace came in a distant third, with 1.81%.

As Truman narrowly won an upset victory over Dewey nationally, Massachusetts weighed in as 7% more Democratic than the national average.

Once a typical Yankee Republican bastion in the wake of the Civil War, Massachusetts had been a Democratic-leaning state since 1928, when a coalition of Irish Catholic and other ethnic immigrant voters primarily based in urban areas turned Massachusetts and neighboring Rhode Island into New England's only reliably Democratic states. Massachusetts voted for Al Smith in 1928 and for Franklin D. Roosevelt four times in the 1930s and 1940s. Truman’s victory thus marked the Democratic Party’s sixth straight win in Massachusetts.

Despite the national race being much closer, Truman in 1948 outperformed any of Roosevelt's four victories in the state of Massachusetts. FDR had never won the state with more than a single-digit margin; Roosevelt’s largest margin of victory was by 9.46% in 1936 and he never took a vote share higher than the 53.11% he received in 1940. In 1944, Roosevelt carried the Bay State with 52.80% to Dewey’s 46.99%, a fairly close margin of only 5.81%. Truman’s victory four years later taking 54.66% and winning by 11.50% thus made 1948 the strongest showing ever by a Democratic presidential candidate in Massachusetts up to that point, a record that would stand until John F. Kennedy ran from Massachusetts in 1960.

Truman would carry 8 of the state’s 14 counties, including the most heavily populated parts of the state surrounding the cities of Boston, Worcester, and Springfield. Notably, Truman flipped highly populated Middlesex County, which had not voted Democratic in any of Franklin Roosevelt’s four victories in the state, into the Democratic column.

Massachusetts and neighboring Rhode Island were the only states in the Northeast to favor Truman over Dewey in 1948, the same split that had occurred in 1928. Both states had large urban Irish Catholic populations, who remained loyal Democrats in the wake of 1928, even as other groups defected back to the GOP.

Results

Results by county

See also
 United States presidential elections in Massachusetts

References

Massachusetts
1948
1948 Massachusetts elections